Miramar Entertainment Park is a shopping mall located in the Dazhi area in Zhongshan District of Taipei, Taiwan.

The shopping mall contains an IMAX theater. With 28m × 21m dimensions, its movie screen is the largest in Asia for screening commercial films.

Ferris wheel

Transportation
The Wenhu line of the Taipei Metro has a station (Jiannan Road station) next to the mall.

See also
 List of tourist attractions in Taiwan

References

2004 establishments in Taiwan
Buildings and structures completed in 2004
Shopping malls in Taipei